CUPS is a mobile app that was launched in New York City in April 2014. It acts as a mobile payment and discovery platform for independent coffee shops. The app is currently active in more than 400 cafes in New York, San Francisco, Philadelphia, Nashville, the Twin Cities, and other US cities. Customers can use the app to find independent coffee shops in their area.

How it works 

The CUPS app gives the user a list of the nearest participating coffee shops to their current location. The app user can visit the store, order a drink using the app, and give the cashier their phone rather than cash or a credit card. The cashier enters a code that enters the purchase into the app's system. The app also allows for onboard tipping and food purchases.

Users download the app from the App Store or Google Play.

In early 2016, the CUPS Cafe Network was launched, using bulk purchasing power to land discounts with service providers which would normally be reserved for larger chains. In this way, the company aims to help its cafe partners compete with the larger coffee chains.

History 
CUPS was founded in Israel in 2012.  The company ran a limited beta pilot in Tel Aviv and Jerusalem featuring 80 locations from September 2012 until September 2014. In October 2013, the founders relocated to New York. CUPS participated in the Entrepreneur's Roundtable Accelerator program and went live in New York on April 11, 2014.

In early 2016, the company began expansion around the US, launching in 30 locations in Philadelphia in February, followed by 40 more locations in San Francisco in March. As of June 2016, CUPS has opened its doors and will consider coffee shops in any US city that are interested in working with them.

References

 Wall Street Journal April 2014
 Forbes April 2014
 The New York Times June 2014
 Alley Wire August 2014
 Pacific Standard October 2014
 Time Out October 2014 
 Street Fight Magazine November 2014
 Time Out November 2014
 Alley Watch December 2014
 Immaculate Infatuation March 2015
 AM New York May 2015 
 Fox Business News May 2015
 Brokelyn News June 1015
 Tech Crunch July 2015
 US News Money July 2015
 InStyle Mag July 2015

Mobile applications